Charles Griffith Ross (November 9, 1885 – December 5, 1950) was White House Press Secretary between 1945 and 1950 for President Harry S. Truman.

Early life
Ross graduated with Truman and Truman's eventual wife Bess Truman in Independence, Missouri from Independence High School (now known as William Chrisman High School), Class of 1901. He was initiated into the Sigma Chi fraternity and graduated from the University of Missouri in 1905. In 1908, he became the first professor of the newly formed Missouri School of Journalism.

Pulitzer Prize

In 1918, he became the Chief Washington correspondent for the St. Louis Post-Dispatch. He won the 1932 Pulitzer Prize for his article titled, "The Country's Plight—What Can Be Done About It?", a discussion of the economic situation of the United States.

In 1934, he became the editorial page editor for the Post-Dispatch and then in 1939 became a contributing editor for the paper.

White House Press Secretary
In 1945, Truman asked Ross to become his Press Secretary.

Despite his long-standing personal relationship with Truman, Ross gained a reputation for trustworthiness since reporters knew he spoke for the president both on and off the record. Very few reporters felt Ross led them astray either.

Death
Ross died of a coronary occlusion at his desk in the White House in December 1950 after giving a press conference as he was preparing to make some comments to the television news.  He was buried in Washington's Mount Olivet Cemetery.

Family
His widow, Florence Griffin, married The Kansas City Star editor Roy A. Roberts in 1953.

References

External links

Truman Library biography

1885 births
1950 deaths
American male journalists
Editors of Missouri newspapers
Journalists from Missouri
Pulitzer Prize for Correspondence winners
Truman administration personnel
University of Missouri alumni
University of Missouri faculty
White House Press Secretaries
William Chrisman High School alumni
Writers from Independence, Missouri
Burials at Mount Olivet Cemetery (Washington, D.C.)